Kjelkehøene  is a mountain in Lesja Municipality in Innlandet county, Norway. It is the 792nd highest mountain in the country of mountains with primary factor of at least 50 meters.

Kjelkehøene consists of two peaks, North and South Kjelkehøene.The higher of the two is Southern Kjelkehøene (1692m), while Northern Kjelkehøene has a height of 1654 meters above sea level.

References

Mountains of Innlandet